Atlıhisar is a village in the Şuhut District, Afyonkarahisar Province, Turkey. Its population is 1,370 (2021). Before the 2013 reorganisation, it was a town (belde).

References

Villages in Şuhut District